Duke of Gandía is a title of Spanish nobility that was first created in 1399 by Martin of Aragon and granted to Alfonso of Aragon and Foix. It has its origin in the lordship of Gandía created in 1323 by James II of Aragon. Later, having no direct descendants, the title passed from the House of Barcelona to the House of Trastámara.

The title was re-established in 1483 by Ferdinand II of Aragon as a favour to Cardinal Rodrigo Borgia for his son Pier Luigi Borgia. The dukedom then went to Pier Luigi's half-brother Giovanni Borgia. He was assassinated, and his young son inherited the title. The fourth duke was the religious figure Francesco Borgia. After the death of his wife, with whom he had a large family, he became a Jesuit.

Dukes of Gandía

House of Aragon

Pedro de Aragón y Anjou, Lord of Gandía (1323–1359)
Alfonso of Aragon and Foix, Lord of Gandía (1359–1399), Duke of Gandia (1399–1412)
Alfonso of Aragon and Eiximenis (1412–1422)
Hugo of Cardona and Gandia (1425–1433)

House of Trastámara

John II of Aragon (1433–1439)
Charles, Prince of Viana (1439–1461)
Ferdinand II of Aragon (1461–1483)

House of Borja or Borgia

On 20 December 1483, the title was re-established by Ferdinand II of Aragon and granted to the House of Borgia, of Spain and Italy.

Pier Luigi de Borgia (Pedro Luis de Borja), 1st duke
Giovanni Borgia (Juan de Borja), 2nd duke
Juan de Borja y Enríquez de Luna, son of Giovanni Borgia, (1495–1543), 3rd duke
Saint Francis Borgia (Francisco de Borja), 4th duke
Carlos de Borja y Aragón, 5th duke
Francisco Tomás de Borja Aragón y Centelles, 6th duke
Francisco Carlos de Borja Aragón y Centelles, 7th duke
Francisco Diego Pascual de Borja Aragón y Centelles, 8th duke
Francisco Carlos de Borja Aragón y Centelles, 9th duke
Pascual Francisco de Borja Aragón y Centelles, 10th duke
Luis Ignacio Francisco Juan de Borja Aragón y Centelles, 11th duke
María Ana Antonia Luisa de Borja Aragón y Centelles, 12th duchess (d. 1748)

House of Pimentel

Francisco de Borja Alfonso Pimentel y Borja
María Josefa Pimentel y Téllez-Girón

House of Osuna

Pedro de Alcántara Téllez-Girón y Beaufort
Mariano Téllez-Girón y Beaufort Spontin
Pedro de Alcantara Téllez-Girón y Fernández de Santillán
María de los Dolores Téllez-Girón y Dominé
Ángela María Téllez-Girón y Duque de Estrada
Chantal Salas-Perez de Gandia
Ángela María de Ulloa y Solís-Beaumont

See also
House of Borgia
Monastery of Sant Jeroni de Cotalba
Route of the Borgias
Ducal Palace of Gandia
History of Spain

Notes

References
Van de Put, Albert: The aragonese double crown the Borja or Borgia device
Borja o Borgia 
Francisco Fernández de Bethencourt - Historia Genealógica y Heráldica Española, Casa Real y Grandes de España, tomo cuarto 
Una rama subsistente del linaje Borja en América española, por Jaime de Salazar y Acha, Académico de Número de la Real Academia Matritense de Heráldica y Genealogía 
Hollingsworth, Mary (2011): The Borgias. History's Most Notorious Dynasty. Quercus.

External links
Gregorio Mayans y la práctica jurídica: Su intervención en el pleito de sucesión el Ducado de Gandía 

Dukedoms of Spain
 
Route of the Borgias
Monastery of Sant Jeroni de Cotalba